
Year 916 (CMXVI) was a leap year starting on Monday (link will display the full calendar) of the Julian calendar.

Events 
 By place 

 Europe 
 Sicilian Berbers in Agrigento revolt and depose the independent Emir Ahmed ibn Khorob. They offer Sicily to the Fatimid Caliphate in Ifriqiya (modern Tunisia). Caliph Abdullah al-Mahdi Billah welcomes this turn of events, but refuses to grant the Berber rulers their autonomy. He sends a Fatimid expeditionary force under Abu Said Musa which lands in Sicily and, with some difficulty, takes control of the island. Abdullah al-Mahdi Billah appoints Salam ibn Rashid as the emir of Sicily. Ahmed ibn Khorob is dispatched to Raqqada and executed.

 Britain 
 Lady Æthelflæd, daughter of the late King Alfred the Great and the widow of Earl Æthelred of Mercia, sends an army into Brycheiniog to avenge the murder of the Mercian abbot Ecbryht and his companions. They seize and burn the royal fort of King Tewdr of Brycheiniog at Llangorse Lake (Wales), and take the queen and thirty-three others captive.

 Asia 
 Abaoji, Khitan ruler and founder of the Liao Dynasty, adopts Chinese court formalities in which he declares himself emperor in the Chinese style and adopts an era name, Taizu of Liao. He names his eldest son Yelü Bei as heir apparent, a first in the history of the Khitan. Abaoji leads a campaign in the west, conquering much of the Mongolian Plains.

 By topic 

 Religion 
 Clement of Ohrid, Bulgarian  scholar, writer and enlightener of the Slavs, dies. He is regarded as the first bishop of the Bulgarian Orthodox Church and the founder of the first Slavic Literary School. Clement is buried in his monastery, Saint Panteleimon, in Ohrid (modern North Macedonia).

Births 
 June 22 – Sayf al-Dawla, Hamdanid emir (d. 967)
 Theodoric I, German nobleman (approximate date)
 Yuan Zong, emperor of Southern Tang (d. 961)

Deaths 
 March 27 – Alduin I, Frankish nobleman
 May 25 – Flann Sinna, king of Meath
 Anarawd ap Rhodri, king of Gwynedd
 Bencion, Frankish nobleman
 Clement of Ohrid, Bulgarian scholar
 Ge Congzhou, Chinese general
 Mór ingen Cearbhaill, queen of Laigin
 Tighearnach ua Cleirigh, king of Aidhne
 Theodora, Roman politician
 Theodoric I, bishop of Paderborn
 Ziyadat Allah III, Aghlabid emir

References